Gus Manolis (February 9, 1923 – January 28, 1958) was an American football coach. He served as the head football coach at Chico State College—now known as California State University, Chico—from 1954 to 1957, compiling a record of 23–12–1. Manolis came to Chico State after a four-year stint, from 1950 to 1953, as the head football coach at Yuba Junior College in  Marysville, California, during which he tallied a mark of 32–8–1.

Manolis, who was of Greek descent, was born on February 9, 1922, in Sacramento, California. He grew up in Sacramento and graduated from C. K. McClatchy High School before moving on to Sacramento Junior College—now known as Sacramento City College—for one year. During World War II, Manolis served in the United States Army Air Forces and spent two and a half years in the European theatre. After his discharge from the military in 1946, he enrolled at the University of California, Berkeley, from which he graduated with a Bachelor of Arts in 1949. As a student, he was an assistant coach for the California Golden Bears football team under head coach Pappy Waldorf. He also earned a general secondary credential in 1950 and a master's degree in 1950, both from Berkeley.

Manolis died on January 28, 1958, near Alder Springs, California, after suffering an apparent heart attack while helping with the search for a missing boy in Grindstone Canyon in the Mendocino National Forest.

Head coaching record

College

References

1923 births
1958 deaths
California Golden Bears football coaches
Chico State Wildcats football coaches
Junior college football coaches in the United States
Sacramento City College alumni
United States Army Air Forces personnel of World War II
United States Army Air Forces soldiers
Sportspeople from Sacramento, California
Coaches of American football from California
Military personnel from California
American people of Greek descent